Lake Dasay is the second largest mountain lake, after Lake Wood, in the province of Zamboanga del Sur, Philippines.

Notes

External links
 DILG Region 9

Dasay
Landforms of Zamboanga del Sur